Norman Douglas Henderson (13 January 1913 – 30 October 2000) was a New Zealand cricketer. He played one first-class match for Otago in 1935/36.

See also
 List of Otago representative cricketers

References

External links
 

1913 births
2000 deaths
New Zealand cricketers
Otago cricketers
Cricketers from Dunedin